The white-black tree frog (Boana albonigra) is a species of frog in the family Hylidae endemic to Bolivia. Its natural habitats are subtropical or tropical moist montane forests, subtropical or tropical high-altitude shrubland, subtropical or tropical high-altitude grassland, and rivers. It is threatened by habitat loss.

References

White-black tree frog
Amphibians of the Andes
Amphibians of Bolivia
Endemic fauna of Bolivia
Amphibians described in 1923
Taxonomy articles created by Polbot